General Montagu  or Montague may refer to:

Charles Montagu (British Army officer) (died 1777), British Army lieutenant general
John Montagu, 4th Earl of Sandwich (1718–1792), British Army general
Thomas Montagu, 4th Earl of Salisbury (1388–1428), English Army lieutenant general 
Percival John Montague (1882–1966), Canadian Army lieutenant general
Robert Miller Montague (1899–1958), U.S. Army lieutenant general

See also
Francis Stewart Montague-Bates, (1876–1954), British Army brigadier general
Edward Montagu-Stuart-Wortley (1857–1934), British Army major general
John Douglas-Scott-Montagu, 2nd Baron Montagu of Beaulieu (1866−1929), British honorary brigadier general